The Real McCoy may refer to:

Film and television 
The Real McCoy (film), a 1993 film starring Kim Basinger
The Real McCoy, a 1999 film starring Andy McCoy
The Real McCoy (TV series), a 1991–1996 British comedy television series
The Real McCoys, a 1957–1962 American television series starring Walter Brennan and Richard Crenna that aired on CBS

Music 
Real McCoy (band), a Eurodance group popular in the 1990s
The Real McCoy, 1960s–70s era Irish showband

Albums
The Real McCoy, album by Charlie McCoy
The Real McCoy, a 1976 album by Van McCoy
The Real McCoy (album), an album by McCoy Tyner

Songs
"The Real McCoy", a 1988 song by Scottish rock band The Silencers
"The Real McCoy", a 2012 song by Get Cape. Wear Cape. Fly
"The Real McCoy", a 1970s track by Klaus Schulze released in the box set Historic Edition

Other uses 
The real McCoy, a phrase meaning "the real thing" or "the genuine article"
McCoy's (crisp), a brand of potato chips marketed under the slogan "The Real McCoy"
Dundas Real McCoys, a hockey team in Dundas, Ontario
The Real McCoy (book), a 2003 novel by American writer Darin Strauss, based on the life of the boxer Charles "Kid" McCoy
The Real McCoy (play) a 2006 stage play by Canadian playwright Andrew Moodie based on the life of inventor Elijah McCoy
Real McCoy (ferry), a ferryboat that operated for 63 years from Rio Vista, California